The 1970 Asian Judo Championships were held in Kaohsiung, Taiwan.

Medal overview

Men's events

Medals table

See also
 List of sporting events in Taiwan

References
Judo Channel by Token Corporation

External links
Judo Union of Asia

Asian Judo Championships
Asian Championships
Asian Judo Championships
International sports competitions hosted by Taiwan
Judo competitions in Taiwan